The 1913–14 Montreal Canadiens season was the team's fifth season and fifth of the National Hockey Association (NHA). The club would post a 13–7 record and tie for first place. The Canadiens met Toronto in a league championship series, losing in a two-game, total-goals series 2–6.

Regular season

Highlights
On January 10, 1914, in a game against the Montreal Wanderers, Newsy Lalonde scored six goals in one game. As of 2014, this is still the Canadiens' record for most goals in one game. Lalonde would repeat the feat in 1920. Lalonde would score five goals in one game one month later on February 11, again against the Wanderers.

Final standings

Schedule and results

Playoffs
The team tied for first and played Toronto for the league championship and Stanley Cup.

Toronto vs. Montreal

References

See also
 1913–14 NHA season

Montreal Canadiens seasons
Montreal Canadiens season, 1913-14